Nishin Lake is a lake in Thunder Bay District, Ontario, Canada.

See also
 Upper Nishin Lake
List of lakes in Ontario

References
 National Resources Canada

Lakes of Thunder Bay District